Peter Hafeni  Vilho (born 2 February 1962) is a Namibian politician and retired rear admiral who is a member of the Parliament of Namibia, a former Minister of Defence, and a former commander of the Namibian Navy. He was appointed the commander of the maritime wing of the Namibian Defence Force in 2002. In September 2017 he was appointed as executive director of the Ministry of Defence. In March 2020, Namibian president Hage Geingob appointed Vilho as the Minister of Defense and Veteran Affairs. Vilho served until his resignation in April 2021 after allegations of holding an undeclared bank account.

Career
Vilho joined SWAPO in exile 1977 as a 15-year-old teenager. In 1981 he then joined the People's Liberation Army of Namibia (PLAN). After joining PLAN in 1981 for basic training he specialised as a combat engineer in 1982, by 1983 Vilho was an engineering instructor at the Tobias Hainyeko Training Centre, Lubango, Angola.  In 1984 he was appointed as an engineer company commander and anti-tank battery commander at the Northern Front and Striking Unit.

Vilho's career in the Namibian Defence Force started in 1990 after Namibia's independence when he was inducted with the rank of Captain and appointed as paymaster for the 125 Battalion in the Namibian Army. In 1993, he was promoted to the rank of Major and appointed as the chief paymaster for the army headquarters. Later in the year he was appointed staff officer grade 2 (SO2) operations and training army headquarters with the same rank. Between the following year and 1998 he attended the Admiral Wandenkolk Instruction Centre' (CIAW) in Rio de Janeiro. Upon graduating he was appointed as the chief of staff NDF Maritime Wing in 1998 and promoted to the rank of Commander. In 2001 he was appointed as the deputy commander NDF Maritime Wing, and in the following year following the death of Captain (Navy) Phestus Sakaria the Commander NDF Maritime Wing, Vilho was appointed as his successor with the rank of Naval Captain. The rank of Commodore was bestowed on him in 2004 at the commissioning of the Maritime Wing as a fully fledged Navy. In 2007 he ascended to the rank of Rear Admiral.

Vilho studied for an Advanced Course and Resource Management Course at Fort Benning from 1990 to 1992 a Finance Officer, and in 1994 was Junior Staff and Command Course, Namibia. He attended the Naval Officers Formation Course, in Brazil between 1995 and 1998 followed by an Advanced Course on Politics and Strategy at the National War College, Brazil. He holds a Master of Business Administration from Maastricht School of Management Netherlands.

Honours and decorations
  Order of the Eagle 3rd Class – Government of the Republic of Namibia
  Ten Year Service Medal – Namibian Defence Force
  NDF Commendation Medal
  Medal of Merit "Tamandare" – Brazilian Navy
  Order of Naval Merit (Grand Officer) Medal – Brazilian Navy
 Southern Cross Medal – Namibian Navy
 Navy Pioneers Medal – Namibian Navy
 Navy Cross Medal – Namibian Navy
 Gold Star Medal – Namibian Navy
 Sacharia Medal – Namibian Navy
 Achievement Medal – Namibian Navy
 Ten Year service – Namibian Navy
 750 Days  at Sea Service Medal – Namibian Navy
  Medal of Merit "Tamandare" – Brazilian Navy

Vilho retired from active military service in September 2017 and was appointed as Executive Director of the Ministry of Defence. On 21 March 2020 president Hage Geingob appointed him as Minister of Defence succeeding Penda ya Ndakolo. With this appointment he also became a non voting member of parliament. On 6 April 2021 Vilho resigned due to allegations of holding an undeclared bank account in Hong Kong that is "linked to illicit proceeds". The resignation triggered a cabinet reshuffle in which Vilho was succeeded by Frans Kapofi.

References

Living people
Namibian military personnel
Recipients of the Order of Naval Merit (Brazil)
1962 births
National heroes of Namibia
People's Liberation Army of Namibia personnel
People from Oshikoto Region
Government ministers of Namibia